Tin Shui Wai Park is the central park of Tin Shui Wai New Town, New Territories, Hong Kong.

It is located alongside the Tin Shui Wai Sports Ground.

History
As with the rest of Tin Shui Wai, the park was built on land reclaimed from low-lying fish ponds.

See also
 List of urban public parks and gardens in Hong Kong

External links
 
 

Urban public parks and gardens in Hong Kong
Yuen Long District